Svay Rieng municipality is a municipality located in Svay Rieng province, Cambodia. It surrounds the provincial capital city of Svay Rieng. According to the 1998 census of Cambodia, it had a population of 21,205.

Administration

References 

Districts of Svay Rieng province